Tennis Channel is an American sports-oriented digital cable and satellite television network owned by the Sinclair Television Group subsidiary of the Sinclair Broadcast Group. It is devoted to events and other programming related to the game of tennis, along with other racquet sports such as badminton, pickleball, and racquetball. Launched on May 15, 2003, the channel is headquartered in Culver City, California, and produces its programming out of an HD-capable broadcast center in the Los Angeles suburb of Culver City. Ken Solomon serves as the network's Chief Executive Officer.

Tennis Channel is available across the United States from most cable providers and on satellite providers DirecTV and Dish Network. As of January 2019, the channel has 61.2 million households as subscribers (66.4% of those with cable).

History
In 2001, Tennis Channel was founded by Steve Bellamy in the shed in his backyard, who soon hired Bruce Rider to head up programming and marketing. A group known as the "Viacom Mafia"—a group that includes Viacom's former CEOs, Philippe Dauman and Frank Biondi, and current CEO, Thomas E. Dooley—became involved in the founding of the channel. This group invested and rounded up additional investors, Bain Capital Ventures, J.P. Morgan Partners, Battery Ventures, Columbia Capital, Pete Sampras and Andre Agassi, who as a group invested about $100 million. These founders felt with other single sports channel like the Golf Channel succeeding with a mostly male demographic and tennis having viewer of both sexes and of a desirable high-end demographic that a tennis channel would draw in  advertisers. The channel was launched in early-2003, with its first live event being a Fed Cup tie in Lowell, Massachusetts in April.Barry MacKay was one of the original Commentators.

In 2005, Tennis Channel acquired the ATP Tour's Franklin Templeton Tennis Classic in Scottsdale (which it had held the television rights to) from IMG, and moved it to Las Vegas as the Tennis Channel Open in 2006. Tennis Channel announced plans to hold women's and junior events alongside it.

In 2005, after struggling viewership (having only reached a subscriber base of 5 million by 2006), attributed to a lack of coverage of high-profile tournaments (such as the Grand Slam), the channel's David Meister was replaced by Ken Solomon. On February 1, 2006, Tennis Channel became a charter member of the new Association of Independent Programming Networks. Tennis Channel's senior vice president of distribution Randy Brown was a co-founder of the group, alongside The American Channel's Doron Gorshein.

Outbidding ESPN by double, Tennis Channel acquired cable rights to the French Open in 2006. The network sub-licensed approximately half of the package to ESPN, at a lower cost than ESPN would have paid for the entire tournament.  In 2008, Tennis Channel sold the Tennis Channel Open event back to the ATP, citing growth of its core businesses tied to its rapid acquisitions of Grand Slam tournament rights;  beginning 2009, Tennis Channel also split cable rights to the US Open with ESPN.

In April 2013, Al Jazeera Media Network was speculated as expressing interest in purchasing the channel to complement beIN Sports, though nothing came of this. The channel opened an online store selling professional and lifestyle golfing merchandise and gear on August 14, 2013. The store is operated by Delivery Agent under the Shop TV brand.

In 2013, Tennis Channel launched its TV Everywhere service Tennis Channel Everywhere. On May 25, 2014, the network also launched Tennis Channel Plus, a new direct-to-consumer subscription service including coverage of additional events not seen on television, also including digital rights to the French Open outside of the finals. Tennis Channel carriers receive a cut of profits from the service.

In 2015, Tennis Channel acquired rights to the Citi Open, an ATP World Tour 500 and WTA International tournament in Washington, D.C., under a four-year contract. The event was formerly part of the US Open Series, but withdrew due to frustration over ESPN (rightsholder of the series due to its new contract to be exclusive broadcaster of the US Open proper) only promising a limited amount of television coverage.

Sinclair era 
On January 27, 2016, Sinclair Broadcast Group, the largest owner of over-the-air television stations in the United States, announced that it would acquire Tennis Channel for $350 million. In the statement announcing the purchase Sinclair CEO David Smith said that Tennis Channel had high-quality content and advertisers, though it had been valued low and was under-distributed. Sinclair also gets greater than $200 million of net operating losses to offset its future taxes. The deal was closed on March 2, 2016. Days later, Tennis Channel announced an extension to its contract for the French Open. In addition, citing its preference to hold rights to the entire tournament, ESPN dropped its sub-licensing agreement with Tennis Channel for the French Open, giving it exclusive cable rights to the tournament (NBC continues to be the broadcast television rightsholder).

In March 2017, Sinclair additionally acquired Tennis magazine and Tennis.com, seeking to integrate Tennis Channel with them to boost its cross-platform presence.

In October 2018, it was announced that Tennis Channel had acquired rights to the 46 overseas events of the WTA Tour under a five-year deal beginning in 2019, replacing beIN Sports. beIN had acquired the WTA Tour rights as part of a larger deal covering 30 countries, but the deal faced criticism from U.S. viewers due to the network's narrow carriage (only serving half as many households as Tennis Channel, with several top providers having also dropped the channel that August), as well as frequent scheduling conflicts favoring soccer coverage.

In 2019, Tennis Channel reached a five-year extension of its rights to the Citi Open. The tournament also re-joined the US Open Series under new ownership.

In October 2020, Tennis Channel renewed its rights to the ATP Tour, and also added rights to Masters 1000 events held in North America beginning in 2021 (previously aired by ESPN under a separate contract). This made Tennis Channel the exclusive U.S. broadcaster of all Masters 1000 events.

On-air personalities 

 Martina Navratilova
 Jim Courier
 Tracy Austin
 Lindsay Davenport
 James Blake
 Chanda Rubin
 Paul Annacone
 Mary Carillo
 Bill Macatee
 Ted Robinson
 Ian Eagle
 Leif Shiras
 Jimmy Arias
 Brett Haber
 Steve Weissman
 Jon Wertheim
 Barry MacKay

Streaming channels
Tennis Channel Plus (2014) a year subscription streaming service.
PLUS 1 (2014) programming would consist of encores, live tournaments and stunt programming.
PLUS 2 (1/2018) programming consists of extended live coverage for multi-court and tournament weeks and encores.
The T (1/2018) a free channel with the best of programming, offer through the app and Stirr at launch on January 16, 2019.

As of March 2022, Tennis Channel added a new channel called T2, which is free.

Programming
The network broadcasts live tournaments, news, one-on-one interviews, game analysis and skills instruction. Tennis Channel provides extensive coverage of the Davis Cup (until 2018), Fed Cup and Hopman Cup as well as other tournaments throughout the year. Tennis Channel is the exclusive cable rightsholder of the French Open; while it previously sub-licensed portions of this coverage to ESPN, this arrangement ended in 2015.

Original series
ATP … Tennis (in 2004). Weekly series on the ATP tours.
Bag Check (in 2004). A look at what is in pro players' racquet bag.
Center Court with Chris Myers (in 2004). Interview show with top pros and coaches.
Girls on Tour (in 2004). Behind-the-scenes with the WTA Tour.
Inside Tennis with the Koz (in 2004). David Kozlowski hosted tip and interview show.
Match Point America (in 2004). Weekly professional circuits highlight magazine show.
No Strings (in 2004). Personal lives of the pros.
One-Minute Clinic (in 2004). Top coaches run live-action tennis technique drills.
Open Access 04 (in 2004). Follows the tours giving "a first-hand account of the top players outside the lines."
Pro File (in 2004). Profiling top and upcoming players on both tours.
Tennis Insiders (in 2004). On-location panel discussion.
On Court with USPTA (in 2004). Instructional show.
Dennis Van der Meer (in 2004) Host is PTR founder and president. PTR is a tennis teacher and coach educating and certifying company.
The Changeover (in 2018) Sports, travel and pop culture collide as Freedom Wynn and his famous friends travel around the country exploring tennis and much more.

High-definition 
The Tennis Channel launched an HD simulcast on December 31, 2007.

Carriage disputes 
On September 4, 2011 during the US Open, Tennis Channel pulled its signal from Verizon FiOS, Cablevision, Suddenlink Communications, Mediacom, WOW!, Knology and General Communication Inc. systems after the providers declined to accept a new agreement that the Tennis Channel made with the National Cable Television Cooperative (a group which the seven providers are members). Along with a fee increase, the agreement also required that the Tennis Channel be moved from their optional sports package to their digital basic tiers. Tennis Channel returned to Verizon FiOS on January 17, 2012.

In July 2012, the Federal Communications Commission ruled in favor of Tennis Channel following a three-year dispute between the network and Comcast over placement on extra-fee sports tier. As a result of the ruling, Comcast was prompted to remove Tennis Channel from its sports package tier, available to customers via an extra charge, and carry the network on the same basic cable tier as Comcast-owned Golf Channel and NBCSN. The FCC found Comcast's previous handling of the network to be discriminatory. This marked the first time that a cable distributor was found to have violated federal anti-discrimination rules. Comcast successfully disputed the ruling in 2013, continuing to carry Tennis Channel on its sports package. Tennis Channel appealed to the Supreme Court, but was denied a hearing.

References

External links
 
 Tennis Channel Everywhere OTT service

Channel
Television networks in the United States
English-language television stations in the United States
Television channels and stations established in 2003
Companies based in Santa Monica, California
Sports television in the United States
Sinclair Broadcast Group
2016 mergers and acquisitions